Trissonchulus janetae is a species of nematode from the Ironidae family. The scientific name of this species was first published in 1961 by Inglis.

References

Nematodes described in 1961
Enoplea